Peter Jungschläger (born 22 May 1984) is a Dutch former professional footballer who played as a midfielder.

Biography
He previously played for VVV-Venlo, RBC Roosendaal, ADO Den Haag and De Graafschap.

On 1 July 2011, he signed for Australian club Gold Coast United who play in the A-League. At the end of the 2011-12 A-League season, the Gold Coast United club folded.

Jungschläger began playing for SVV Scheveningen in 2015, and retired from football after three seasons there.

Honours
De Graafschap
 Eerste Divisie: 2009–10

References

External links
 Voetbal International profile 

1984 births
Living people
Dutch footballers
Dutch expatriate footballers
ADO Den Haag players
RBC Roosendaal players
VVV-Venlo players
De Graafschap players
Gold Coast United FC players
RKC Waalwijk players
Eredivisie players
Eerste Divisie players
Derde Divisie players
A-League Men players
Expatriate soccer players in Australia
Sportspeople from Voorburg
Association football midfielders
SVV Scheveningen players
Dutch expatriate sportspeople in Australia
Footballers from South Holland